Marieta Morosina Priuli (fl. 1667) was an Italian composer.

She was born in Venice into the Morosina family.    Priuli published a collection of works in 1667 dedicated to the Habsburg Dowager Empress Eleonor Magdalene of Neuburg entitled Balletti e correnti. It included five sets of pieces for three string instruments and harpsichord continuo, and eight correnti.

Only two Italian women from this period of time are known to have published instrumental music. Each of them published only one collection in this field. Priuli's Balletti e correnti was one of these collections. The other was Isabella Leonarda's Opus 16.

References

Italian Baroque composers
Italian music educators
Year of birth unknown
Year of death missing
Italian women classical composers
Marieta
Marieta
17th-century Italian composers
17th-century Italian women